Those She Left Behind is a 1989 American made-for-television drama film directed by Waris Hussein and starring Gary Cole, Joanna Kerns, and Mary Page Keller. Its plot concerns a father forced to raise his newborn daughter alone after the unexpected death of his wife of an extremely rare condition during childbirth. It was inspired by the sitcom Full House and enjoyed some of the sitcom's success due to some shared themes as well as similar casting. Co-star Colleen Dewhurst won a 1989 Primetime Emmy Award for Outstanding Supporting Actress - Miniseries or a Movie.

Plot
Gary Cole stars as Scott Grimes, a man who owns a rising realty business. His wife Sue, played by Mary Page Keller, is pregnant with their first child. So it would seem Scott has everything a man could ever want.

Unfortunately, when Sue is giving birth, she ends up passing away due to a pregnancy complication. Their daughter, Katie, is saved.

Now Scott is left to shoulder the burden of losing his wife so suddenly, along with being a single father. He hires a few nannies to care for her with no success. He even brings her to work with him to care for her. The stress is overwhelming, but he is dealing with it.

However, the breaking point comes when Katie is crying and screaming almost nonstop for about two days. Scott can't figure out why, going as far as walking out of the room on her saying, "I don't know what you want!" He takes her into the hospital the next day to find out she had been suffering from a hernia. After being probed by the doctor on why she wasn't brought in sooner, he confessed he didn't know what to do. Scott went so far as to saying he thought she was just being fussy. The doctor then asked him if he realizes what could've happened to her, had he ignored her one more day. A look of fear comes over his face as realization sets in.

Afterwards, he considers giving Katie up for adoption. Instead, Sue's parents offer to watch her until he gets himself straightened out. Eventually, he accepts his role as a father, gets his daughter back, and carries on.

Cast
 Gary Cole ...  Scott Grimes
 Joanna Kerns ...  Diane Pappas
 Mary Page Keller ...  Sue Grimes
 George Coe ...  Bill Page
 Maryedith Burrell ...  Ann Hobson
 Colleen Dewhurst ...  Margaret Page
 Joel Polis ...  Kerns
 Saachiko ...  Dr. Yamura
 Judyann Elder ...  Counselor
 Paul Mendoza ...  Acosta
 David Selburg ...  Dr. Razzar
 Lupe Ontiveros ...  Rosa
 Harry Stephens ...  Dr. Paul Spencer
 James Edgcomb ...  Poker player (as Jim Edgecomb)
 Folkert Schmidt ...  Eric

References

External links

1989 films
1989 television films
1989 drama films
American drama television films
Films scored by Mark Snow
Films directed by Waris Hussein
NBC network original films
NBC Productions films
Works about parenting
1980s English-language films
1980s American films